Leptospermum pallidum is a species of spreading shrub that is endemic to Queensland. It has thin, firm, rough bark, narrow lance-shaped leaves, white flowers arranged in groups of two or three on side shoots and fruit that remains on the plant until it dies.

Description

Taxonomy and naming
Leptospermum pallidum was first formally described in 1992 by Anthony Bean in the journal Austrobaileya. The specific epithet (pallidum) is a Latin word meaning "pale", referring to the colour of the leaves.

Distribution and habitat
This tea-tree grows on rocky slopes and cliff edges, mostly near Greenvale but also at Porcupine Gorge.

Conservation status
This species is classified as "near threatened" under the Queensland Government Nature Conservation Act 1992.

References

pallidum
Myrtales of Australia
Flora of Queensland
Plants described in 1992